National Voice is Hindi-language television news channel.

References 

Hindi-language television channels in India
24-hour television news channels in India
Television channels and stations established in 2016